Au Tak (also spelled Au Tack; ; 1840–1920) or Au Chak-mun was a Hong Kong entrepreneur. He was the proprietor of a furniture shop and the property developers in Central District on Hong Kong Island. He used to be the director of Tung Wah Hospital.

In 1912, Au went into partnership with his father-in-law Sir Kai Ho to form a company to develop a piece of land formed by land reclamation in Kowloon Bay. It was planned to build a residential garden estate, but the plan failed and the company went into liquidation in 1924, after both Au and Ho had died. In 1925, the land was taken over by the British Hong Kong Government as the use of the airport.

See also 
 Munsang College (named after Tak (Au Tak Mun) and Mok Kon Sang)

References

1840 births
1920 deaths
Hong Kong businesspeople
Hong Kong educators
People from Nanhai District
Businesspeople from Guangdong
Educators from Guangdong